Dioscoreophyllum gossweileri is a plant species native to Angola. It is a twining vine with deeply tri-lobed leaves and a racemose inflorescence.

Dioscoreophyllum gossweileri Exell, J. Bot. 73(Suppl.): 10. 1935.

References

Menispermaceae
Flora of Africa
Flora of Angola
Plants described in 1935